Chirakodinja Kinavukal (English: Dreams with Broken Wings) is a 2015 Malayalam spoof film. Directed by debutant Santhosh Viswanath, the film has been produced by Listin Stephen under the banner of Magic Frames. It has the notable achievement of being the first ever Malayalam parody film. The film features Kunchacko Boban played triple role two leads and one cameo appearance alongside Sreenivasan and Rima Kallingal in the lead roles along with Joy Mathew, Mamukkoya, Saiju Kurup and Srinda Ashab. Chirakodinja Kinavukal released on 1 May to generally mixed to positive reviews.

Plot 
Ambujakshan at long last gets to meet a director and a producer to narrate his story 'Chirakodinja Kinavukal', which he hopes would finally be made into a film. He declares that he has made a few changes to the script to meet the requirements of the new gen cinema, though the hero of his tale, Thayyalkkaran and his heroine Sumathi have not changed.
As per Ambujakshan’s story, Sumathi falls in love with a local tailor, Thayyalkkaran. Virakuvettukaran, her father, a rich woodcutter, is against this relationship and decides to marry her off to an NRI. Since it is seemingly futile to stop the marriage, the tailor tries to commit suicide and gets hospitalized. Surprisingly, the marriage comes to a halt. Therefore, in the end, Sumathi and the Tailor reunite.

Cast 
 Kunchacko Boban as Triple role Thayyalkaran (Tailor), UK Karan (NRI) and Gulf Karan (NRI)
 Sreenivasan as N.P. Ambujakshan
 Rima Kallingal as Sumathi
 Joy Mathew as Virakuvettukaran, Sumathi's father
 Srinda Ashab as Sumathi's friend
 Shebin Benson as Young Thayyalkaran
 Manoj K Jayan as  Uthaman
 Jacob Gregory as Santhosh Balaji
 Idavela Babu as Thayyalkaran's Friend
 Saiju Kurup as Commissioner K. P. Benny IPS
 Vijayakumar as Sub Inspector
 Mamukkoya as Broker
 Innocent as Mapranam Karayogam President T. P. V. Kurup (cameo)
 Lalu Alex as Thayyalkaran's father (cameo)
 Sasi Kalinga as Joppan's Perappan (photo only)
Muktha (actress) in a Cameo Appearance

Reception 
Chirakodinja Kinavukal received mixed reaction from viewers and positive reviews from critics. Critics appreciated the style of film which portrayed the pre-existed and existing cliches in contemporary Malayalam cinema. Paresh C Palicha of Rediff.com states that Chirakodinja Kinavukal  doesn’t lampoon any superstars or directors, but it does make fun of cliche-ridden films. Deepa Soman of Times Of India praised the storyline of film and performances of actors.

Soundtrack 
The film's soundtrack contains 3 songs, all composed by Deepak Dev and Lyrics by B. K. Harinarayanan.

References

External links
 

Indian parody films
2010s Malayalam-language films
$Ambuj2